<noinclude>

Ismat Iqbal is a Pakistani television actress. She has appeared as child and later lead actress in classic serials aired on PTV Home during 1970-1990. Currently, she is active in television industry playing role of mother on different serials airing on different networks. Her most recent appearance include Aik Larki Aam Si as Minhaj's mother and Ranjha Ranjha Kardi as Noori's mother.

She was introduced to Pakistan Television by Director Bakhtiar Ahmad.

Selected television work

References

Latest serial 2019
Hania (24)episode 
Mujay beta chahiya  (24)episodes 
Mai maaf nai karongi  (25) episodes

External links

Pakistani television actresses
Living people
21st-century Pakistani actresses
1965 births
University of Karachi alumni